The Song of the Sun is a 1933 Italian-German comedy film directed by Max Neufeld and starring Vittorio De Sica.

Cast
 Giacomo Lauri Volpi as himself
 Vittorio De Sica as Paladino, l'avvocato
 Lilliane Dietz as Frida Brandt
 Eva Magni as Signora Bardelli
 Livio Pavanelli as Il Giornalista
 Umberto Melnati as Bardelli
 Celeste Almieri as Il Segretario

References

External links

1933 films
1933 comedy films
German comedy films
Italian comedy films
Films of the Weimar Republic
1930s Italian-language films
German black-and-white films
Italian black-and-white films
Films directed by Max Neufeld
Italian multilingual films
German multilingual films
1933 multilingual films
1930s Italian films
1930s German films